Adam Yamaguchi (Los Angeles, California) is an American television journalist and producer. Yamaguchi was a correspondent and producer for the Peabody Award winning series Vanguard on Current TV, a former cable network founded by US Vice President Al Gore.

Early life 
Yamaguchi graduated from UCLA with degrees in economics as well as communications.  While attending UCLA, Yamaguchi served as editor-in-chief at the Daily Bruin newspaper from 1998 to 1999.

Career 
Yamaguchi has worked at Fox Sports, CNN and TV Asahi Japan, as well as freelance journalist for various agencies while traveling in pursuit of stories. He has covered the Space Shuttle Columbia disaster, the 2000 presidential election and September 11 attacks as well as other major U.S. events. Yamaguchi has also covered international events including the wars in Afghanistan and Iraq, indigenous cultures in the Amazon, Argentina's economic collapse, the Inuit whale hunt, Japanese suicide, Korean defectors, Global Warming, AIDS in Cuba, free press in the Middle East, and the HIV/AIDS epidemic in India.

While producing a series of reports on global warming and other environmental issues, Yamaguchi traveled to Colombia and Bolivia to produce a series on coca cultivation and changing attitudes toward U.S. policy in the region.

Yamaguchi's Vanguard credits include an in-depth look at the Northern Mariana Islands and Saipan with the collapse of its largest industry, the manufacturing of textiles. The Vanguard documentary also featured a look at Japan's impending population collapse. In the Vanguard series, Yamaguchi also examined glacial melting in Greenland, as well as the crisis of open defecation in Southeast Asia.

In 2014 Yamaguchi became a correspondent with CBS Corporation. In 2016 he moved on to become an Executive Producer of longform documentaries at CBS News, such as Speaking Frankly and Reverb series for CBSN Originals.

See also
Vanguard
Current TV
Christof Putzel
Mariana van Zeller

References

Television personalities from Los Angeles
American people of Japanese descent
University of California, Los Angeles alumni
Current TV people
Living people
CNN people
Television producers from California
Year of birth missing (living people)